The following lists events that happened during 1900 in Chile.

Incumbents
President of Chile: Federico Errázuriz Echaurren

Events

October
10 October – The Santiago National football club is founded.

Undated

Births
5 April – Jorge González von Marées (died 1962)
21 May – Hernan Alessandri (died 1982)
13 July – Teresa of Los Andes (died 1920)
18 July – Juan Gómez Millas (died 1987)

Deaths

September 
September 18 – José Ravest y Bonilla, lawyer, writer, and judge (b. 1823)

Date unknown 
Eduardo de la Barra

Notes
It’s likely that early meteorological annuals may have underestimated totals in Valparaíso as smaller falls may not have been recorded accurately.

References 

 
Chile